Facelina dubia is a species of sea slug, an aeolid nudibranch, a marine gastropod mollusc in the family Facelinidae.

Distribution
This species has been reported from County Cork, Ireland south to the Mediterranean Sea.

References

Facelinidae
Gastropods described in 1948
Taxa named by Alice Pruvot-Fol